Christian Petersen (1885–1961) was a Danish-born American sculptor and university teacher. He was the first permanent artist in residence at a U.S. college or university, and he is noted for the large body of sculpture associated with a single place, Iowa State College, now Iowa State University.

Biography 
Born in Denmark, he emigrated the United States in 1894 with his parents. In 1900 he became an apprentice die cutter and later attended the Fawcett School of Design and the Rhode Island School of Design. He joined the Art Students League of New York, and studied with leading artists there, including Henry Hudson Kitson and George Bridgman. He worked as a die cutter at the Robins Company in Attleboro, Massachusetts and continued to sculpt, gaining commissions for works in the East and Midwest through Kitson's connections.

At the start of the Great Depression he moved to the Midwest, and eventually took a job working for Grant Wood in the Public Works of Art Project headquartered in Iowa City, Iowa. Through a WPA commission to create relief sculptures for the Dairy Industry Building at Iowa State College in Ames, Iowa, he became acquainted with the college president, who appointed him Sculptor in Residence in 1935. This was the first known instance of an artist in residence at a US university. Petersen was appointed Associate Professor and retired in 1955.

He was married to Emma L. Hoenicke from 1908 to 1928, with whom he had three children, Helene, Lawrence, and Ruth. He married Charlotte Garvey in 1931, and had a daughter Mary Charlotte in 1936.
Chronology

1885	Christian Petersen born at Dybbol in Schleswig region of Denmark

1894	Emigrated from Denmark with family. After a brief period nhear Paxton, Illinois, the family moved to Newark, New Jersey

1900-1907	Educated in die-cutting at Newark Technical School. Attended art classes at Fawcett School of Design in Newark.

1907	Began work as a die-cutter at the Robbins Company in Attleboro, Massachusetts, which specialized in jewelry and metal objects. Met lifelong friend, George Nerney, who encouraged his ambitions as a sculptor.

1908	Marriage to Emma L. Hoenicke

1909	Birth of daughter, Helene

1910	Enrolled in "Antique" class taught by George Bridgman at the Art Students League in New York in October and November. His residence was listed as Newark.

1911-12	Living again in Attleboro, Petersen attended art classes at the Rhode Island School of Design. Birth of son, Lawrence, in 1912.

1915	Birth of daughter, Ruth.

1917	His sculpture, Josiah Everett Draper, accepted at annual exhibition of the Pennsylvania Academy of Fine Arts

1918	First known critical notice on his sculpture appeared in article in the Boston Transcript.

1919	Commissioned for his first known public sculpture, the Nurses Memorial, for the city of Attleboro

1920	Associated with Boston sculptors, Henry Hudson Kitson and Theo Alice Ruggles Kitson, and maintained studio in Boston.

1923	Atteboro chapter of the American Federation of Arts formed

1924	Given honorary membership in Attleboro AFA. November 19 - December 7: Petersen's first known major exhibition, shared with the painter C. Arnold Slade, at the Attleboro Public Library, sponsored by the Attleboro AFA.

Mid-1920s	Established contacts with patrons in Iowa, notably Edgar J. Harlan, Curator of the Historical, Memorial and Art Department of the state of Iowa.

1927	Raymond M. Hughes is appointed president of Iowa State College on September 1.

1928	October 28 - November 11: participated in group exhibition at the Attleboro Public Library, sponsored by the Attleboro AFA. By November, had moved from the east to the Midwest. He and his wife were divorced.

1929	By December, Petersen is firmly documented in Chicago where he sculpted portraits of Meskwaki tribal leaders commissioned by Harlan.

1930	His portraits of Edgar Harlan and Jay N. ("Ding") Darling accepted for annual exhibition at Pennsylvania Academy of Fine Arts. His sculptural opportunities lessened by the Great Depression, Petersen returned to die-cutting for Chicago business, Dodge and Ascher.

1931	Married Charlotte Garvey, a secretary for Dodge and Ascher.

1932	Petersen resumed full-time sculpting and moved his studio to Belvedere, Illinois. Christian and Charlotte Petersen spend much of the year in Des Moines working on commissions from Harlan and private Des Moines citizens. Slow payments on sculpture result in illness and severe financial constraints for the couple, eased by small loan from Des Moines patrons.

1933	Petersen's first known Midwestern solo exhibition, "Sculptures by Christian Petersen," at Younkers Tea Room Gallery in Des Moines, July 17 - September 1. Petersen received first commission from President Raymond Hughes at Iowa State College for a fountain for the Dairy Industry courtyard.

1934	January, hired by Grant Wood for the Public Works of Art Project, the Petersens moved permanently to Iowa.
	October, moved permanently to Ames where Hughes hired Petersen as sculptor-in-residence at Iowa State College.

1935	April, Petersen installed the first of many public sculptures at Iowa State College: the seven-panel relief mural, The History of Dairying.

1936–Petersen completed the Three Athletes for the State Gym and Reclining Nudes for Roberts Hall. Cha-Ki-Shi, a children's book on the Mesquakie Indians of Tama was published with illustrations by Petersen. His daughter, Mary Charlotte, was born on November 24.

1938–Veterinary Medicine Mural and The Gentle Doctor were completed. Petersen moved into a space offered by Dean Charles Murray in a converted horse hospital in the Veterinary Medicine Building (now Lagomarcino Hall), a studio where Petersen would work for the rest of his life. As part of a commission for a portrait plaque of the University of Kentucky president, the Petersens took a summer trip to that state, where Petersen carried out a series of drawings of rural Kentucky scenes. These drawings were the basis of a series of small sculptures over the next several years.

1939–In the spring semester, men allowed into Petersen's expanding sculpture class schedule for the first time.

1941–The Fountain of the Four Seasons unveiled.

1942–The Marriage Ring installed. Iowa State College recognized Petersen with a dinner in his honor and an exhibition at the Memorial Union.

1944– Library Boy and Girl installed at the Parks Library.

1949–Converted to Catholicism at age 64.

Late 1940s and early 1950s–Petersen created a number of religious works of art, many of which were commissioned by churches and schools in Iowa.

1953–Petersen's daughter Mary entered Mount Carmel Convent in Dubuque, Iowa, where she remained for ten years.

1955–Completed Conversations before retiring at the age of 70.

Late 1950s–Continued to create portraits and reliefs for private and public commissions. He also taught clay modeling to handicapped children twice a week as a volunteer at Smouse Opportunity School in Des Moines.

1959–Began the design for A Dedication to the Future. He suffered a heart attack later that year.

1961–Petersen died of cancer on April 4, four days after inspecting and signing the last casting mold for A Dedication to the Future for the Fisher Community Center in Marshalltown, Iowa.

1964–Eighty of the remaining works in Petersen's studio were offered for sale to the public in behalf of Charlotte Petersen by close friends.

1976–The Brunnier Gallery, now the Brunnier Art Museum, presented the exhibition "Christian Petersen" from May 8–30. A new Veterinary Medicine Building was constructed and Petersen's relief mural was moved to its courtyard. The sculpture of The Gentle Doctor was placed on the main floor of the Scheman Building in the Iowa State Center. A new bronze casting of the statue was made and placed in the courtyard of the new veterinary complex.

1980–The Iowa State University College of Design established the annual Christian Petersen Design Award to honor staff, faculty, alumni and friends of the university.

1981–The artist's son Lawrence Christian Petersen died.

1982–The Iowa Veterinary Medical Association celebrated its centennial year by commissioning a commemorative bronze medallion featuring the image of The Gentle Doctor, international symbol of veterinary medicine.

1985–The Brunnier Museum and Gallery published a walking tour guide to the visual arts at Iowa State University including Petersen's works. In May, Charlotte moved into a retirement home. She and her daughter Mary sold many of Christian's studio sculptures. Mary also found more than 400 of his sketches and early photographs that had been stored since 1945. They are now in the Christian Petersen Collection, Brunnier Art Museum. On December 15, Charlotte died.

1986–Christian Petersen Remembered, a biography by Patricia Lounsbury Bliss, published by Iowa State University Press. The exhibition "Christian Petersen Remembered," which included small sculptures and models from private collections, was held at the Octagon Center for the Arts in Ames, Iowa from August 31 through October 15. The Brunnier Museum and Gallery announced a program to inspect and conserve Petersen's outdoor sculptures.

1987–Petersen's dairy courtyard sculptures, after a nomination submitted by Patricia L. Bliss, were accepted for the National Register of Historic Places on April 7. The artist's daughter Ruth Eleanor Sollenberger died on October 8.

1988–The exhibition "Christian Petersen: Images of Youth" held at the Brunnier Gallery and Museum from January through March. Petersen's sculpture Drought was included in "New Deal Art of the Upper Midwest: An Anniversary Exhibition" at the Sioux City Art Center in Sioux City, Iowa.

1991–The Marriage Ring moved inside MacKay Hall to prevent further damage. A reinforced concrete replica was made and placed outside.

1993–The replica of The Marriage Ring showed flaws and was redone. The molds used in making the replica had been destroyed in a flood that summer; new molds were made and the sculpture was recast.
 
1995–Conservation of For Melke and Chese and Buttere and the fountain and mural in the Food Sciences Building, formerly Dairy Industry, completed.

1996–1997–Petersen's Two Children were loaned to the Sioux City Art Center for the exhibition "A Decade of Motivation: Iowa and the Federal Arts Project, 1933-1943".

1997–Bronze casting of The Gentle Doctor and the original Veterinary Medicine Mural conserved and rededicated at the College of Veterinary Medicine.

1998–Conservation completed on the Fountain of the Four Seasons, the Boy and Girl in the Parks Library, and on the following eleven small studio sculptures: Flood, Charlotte, Drought, Soon After the Flood, Price of Victory, Risen Christ, bronze casting of The Gentle Doctor, Reverend W. Barlow, Mother and Child, Soldier, Two Maidens and Dean Helen Benitez.

1999–Completed conservation projects include Three Athletes at State Gym, Four Thousande Yeeres mural in the Food Sciences Building, Reclining Nudes in Roberts Hall, The Gentle Doctor in terra cotta, four large plaster castings of the maidens of Fountain of the Four Seasons, and the heads of the children's figures on the Marriage Ring at MacKay Hall.

2000–Conservation was completed by Linda Merk Gould and Francis Miller of Conservation Technical Associates on the following twenty-one studio sculptures: Country Doctor; Price of Victory (Fallen Soldier); 4-H Calf; Cornhusker; History of Dairying Mural: Study of cows; Laura; Wallace; The Gentle Doctor: Model; Cowboy, Cutting Horse and Two Polled Hereford Heifers; Colonel W. F. Godson, Fort Des Moines; Rose Shloss; Frances McCray; Ralph K. Bliss; Stephen Vincent Benet; Christ with Bound Hands; Charlotte and Mary; George Washington Carver; Library Boy: Model; Library Girl: Model; Buffalo; and Saint Bernard of Clairvaux. May 3 – Petersen's eldest daughter Helene Petersen Male (born 1909) died. Retrospective exhibition, "Christian Petersen, Sculptor," from August 22 through December 30, and publication with the same title of a series of essays and a catalog of Petersen's known lifetime works published in conjunction with the 25th Anniversary of the Brunnier Art Museum, University Museums, Ames, Iowa.

2003-4-H Calf was cast in bronze at the Polich Art Foundry in Rock Tavern, New York. Linda Merk Gould (see above 2000) supervised the casting process, and the final restoration of the original plaster sculpture. The 4-H Calf first casting (no more than 9 will ever be made) was appropriately located in the atrium or WOW (Why Opportunity Works) Center of the newly built Iowa State University Extension 4-H Youth Building which houses the 4-H Youth Development Program's State Extension and Outreach staff, Iowa 4-H Foundation, and other Extension and Outreach offices.

2007-The Christian Petersen Art Museum opens in historic Morrill Hall, Iowa State University campus. The exhibitions include works of art by Petersen as well as his contemporaries.

2009-The Anderson Sculpture Garden surrounding Morrill Hall is dedicated. Christian Petersen's Cornhusker, 4-H Calf, Library Boy and Girl Models, Seated Abraham Lincoln, and Reclining Nudes are all located in the sculpture garden.

Selected works 

History of Dairying Mural(1933–34)Fact Sheet
Gentle Doctor (1936) Fact Sheet
Three Athletes (1936)
Library Boy and Girl (1944–1945)
Fountain of Four Seasons (1941)Fact Sheet
Flood (1938)
Soon After Flood (1939)
Old Woman in Prayer (1940)
Madonna of the Prairie (1941)
Marriage Ring (1942)
The Marriage Ring (1942)
The Price of Victory (1944)
Library Boy & Girl (1944)
Conversations (1945–1955)
Viking (1946)
George Washington Carver (1949)
Christ with Bound Hands (1950)
Attleboro War Chest (1918), unlocated
Panthers (1920s), bronze, previously unlocated, found in 2010 at Middlebury College, VT. Recently purchased by University Museums, Iowa State University, Ames, IA to be installed on central campus east of Morrill Hall in April 2012.
A pair of felines installed at the entrance gate to the Charles J. Davol Estate "Wildacres" in North Kingstown, Rhode Island. If you know more information about these Panthers or other works of art by Petersen, please contact the Christian Petersen Art Museum.

Additional information on works of art by Christian Petersen

Legacy 

Petersen's sculpture is predominantly Neoclassical and beaux arts in style, and he virulently denounced modernism. He especially admired Augustus Saint-Gaudens' reliefs and war memorials. But he also included some gestures toward modernism in his relief sculptures, perhaps under the influence of Grant Wood.

His large scale sculpture has been the object of numerous restoration projects at Iowa State University, to preserve his public art legacy. Other of his works are collected in the Christian Petersen Museum, in the restored Morrill Building on the campus.
 
Though his major works consist primarily of public art at Iowa State University and the surrounding community, his early work has received recent attention, including a retrospective exhibition in 2006 of his work from the 1910s and 1920s done at the Art Students League, in Rhode Island, Boston, and Attleboro, MA. Many of these early works of art are unlocated and Iowa State University Museums is actively searching for the sculptures or information leading to their location.

Quotations 

 "An artist is one of you. Very much one of you. He must be in your hearts, and you in his."
 "A number of years ago, I had the feeling that the center of culture would eventually find itself in the Middlewest. I felt the east has so much conscious culture that it was subject to spells of indigestion-and it was taking to 'isms' as some folks take to patent medicines."
 "Here in the midwest, I felt folks would be more natural, and I have found it to be so in the main...So judge for yourself. Create an American art, here in the rich soil of the middlewest, where America has its roots. Here shall be the soil and the seed and the strength of art."

References 

 
 Christian Petersen Remembered by Patricia Bliss, Iowa State Press, November 1, 1986
 Christian Petersen: Sculptor by Lea Delong & Patricia Bliss, Iowa State University Press, August 1, 2000

External links 
  Christian Petersen - Biography, Timeline, and Publications on by University Museums, Iowa State University]
 Christian Petersen in the Smithsonian Institution Research Information System (SIRIS)
 Success: University Museums adds major Petersen sculpture to its collection
 "Panthers"
 Long lost Petersen panther sculpture coming to Iowa State
 Christian Petersen Papers (archives)
 Christian Petersen Digital Collection

1885 births
1961 deaths
People from Sønderborg Municipality
Danish emigrants to the United States
Public Works of Art Project artists
20th-century American sculptors
20th-century American male artists
American male sculptors
Federal Art Project artists